"Pull Up" is a song by British YouTuber and rapper KSI featuring fellow British rapper Jme. It was independently released for digital download and streaming on 12 April 2019. A music video was later released on 4 May 2019. The video portrays a murder mystery narrative, set during the 1920s Chicago prohibition, with KSI playing the role of an Al Capone-like gangster and Jme playing the role of a newspaper journalist attempting to bring him in.

Writing and production

Commercial performance 
In the United Kingdom, "Pull Up" debuted at number 94 on the UK Singles Chart.

Music video 
The music video for "Pull Up" was directed by Konstantin. A trailer was released to KSI's social media pages on 1 May 2019. The music video was released to KSI's YouTube channel three days later on 4 May 2019 and it has received over 18 million views. A behind-the-scenes video of the music video shoot was released to YouTube by Konstantin on the same day. The cinematic, film noir-like music video takes a trip back in time to portray a murder mystery narrative, set during the 1920s Chicago prohibition. The video stars KSI as an Al Capone-like antagonist who rapidly gains notoriety for his gangster misdemeanours, whilst Jme plays the role of a newspaper journalist attempting to bring him in.

Credits and personnel 
Credits adapted from Tidal.

 KSIsongwriting, vocals
 Jmesongwriting, vocals
 P2Jproduction, songwriting
 Sammy Sosoproduction, songwriting

Charts

Release history

References

External links 
 

2019 songs
KSI songs
Jme (musician) songs
Songs written by KSI
UK drill songs
Trap music songs